Joshua "Josh" Ayoola Fawole (born July 21, 1998) is an American soccer player who plays as a forward for Dulwich Hamlet F.C.

Career

College
Fawole played four years of college soccer at Loyola University Maryland between 2016 and 2019, making 68 appearances, scoring 20 goals and tallying 10 assists.

While playing at college, Fawole appeared in the USL PDL with Baltimore Bohemians in 2016, NPSL side FC Baltimore in 2018, and the now rebranded USL League Two in 2019 with The Villages SC.

Professional
On January 9, 2020, Fawole was selected 42nd overall in the 2020 MLS SuperDraft by D.C. United. Though D.C. United declined to make him an offer, Fawole did sign with their USL Championship affiliate, Loudoun United, on March 6, 2020. He made his professional debut on March 7, 2020, appearing as a 57th-minute substitute in a 0–0 draw with Philadelphia Union II.

On October 8, 2021, following a trial period, Fawole agreed to join Aldershot Town of the National League, before immediately joining Farnborough on a short-term loan. Fawole returned to Aldershot in January and went onto feature four times in all competitions before another loan move, this time joining Salisbury in February. On 22 March 2022, Fawole then joined Southern League Premier Division South side Beaconsfield Town on loan. Fawole was released at the end of the 2021–22 season.

In August 2022, Fawole joined Maidstone United, following a successful trial period and went onto make his debut during a 2–1 home victory over York City.

On March 4, 2023, Fawole agreed to join Dulwich Hamlet F.C of the National League South after being released from Maidstone United and a brief one month stint at Aveley FC. He made his debut for the club that same day in the 70th minute of a 1-0 win against fellow National League South side St. Albans City F.C.

Career statistics

References

External links
Josh Fawole at Loyola Greyhounds men's soccer

Joshua Fawole at USL Championship

1998 births
Living people
American soccer players
Association football forwards
Baltimore Bohemians players
D.C. United draft picks
Loudoun United FC players
Loyola Greyhounds men's soccer players
National Premier Soccer League players
People from Columbia, Maryland
Soccer players from Maryland
Sportspeople from the Baltimore metropolitan area
USL Championship players
USL League Two players
National League (English football) players
Southern Football League players
The Villages SC players
Aldershot Town F.C. players
Farnborough F.C. players
Salisbury F.C. players
Beaconsfield Town F.C. players
Maidstone United F.C. players